Scoruşu may refer to several villages in Romania:

 Scoruşu, a village in Borăscu Commune, Gorj County
 Scoruşu, a village in Lăpușata Commune, Vâlcea County